Janice Giteck (born June 27, 1946 in New York) is an American composer.

Biography
Giteck grew up in Hicksville, Long Island and moved to Arizona when she was twelve years old. She attended Mills College, completing her Master's in 1969 and studying under Darius Milhaud. She later studied under Olivier Messiaen, and following this she studied Indonesian gamelan music with Daniel Schmidt and percussion with Obo Addy. Her works came into wide circulation in the 1970s and 1980s, with a style heavily influenced by world music and the music of American Indians. Awards for her music include the National Endowment for the Arts Composer's award for Breathing Songs from a Turning Sky, and the Norman Fromm Composers Award for Thunder, Like a White Bear Dancing. Giteck returned to school and received a Master's in psychology in 1986, and worked in the mental health field from 1986 to 1991. She has taught at Cornish College of the Arts in Seattle since 1979. Her 1992 recording collection Home (Revisited), released on New Albion, is dedicated to AIDS patients. Her music has been described as influenced by world and ritual music.

Discography
 New Performance Group in Music (Mode Records, 1988)
 Home (Revisited) (New Albion, 1992)

Partial list of works
 Thunder, Like a White Bear Dancing (1977)
 Callin' Home Coyote (1978)
 TREE (1981) commissioned by San Francisco Symphony
 Soundtrack, Hopi:Songs of the Fourth World (1983)
 Breathing Songs from a Turning Sky (1980; revised 1984)
 Om Shanti (1986)
 Soundtrack, Hearts and Hands (1987)
 Tapasya (1987)
 Leningrad Spring (1992)
 Home (Revisited) (1992)
 Soundtrack, Rabbit in the Moon (1999)
 Soundtrack, Daddy & Papa (2002)
 Ishi (2004) commissioned by Seattle Chamber Players
 Accompanying music to Rene Yung's installation Four Dignities (2005)

References

1946 births
20th-century classical composers
American women classical composers
American classical composers
Cornish College of the Arts faculty
Living people
People from Hicksville, New York
Pupils of Darius Milhaud
20th-century American women musicians
20th-century American composers
20th-century women composers